Thomas Rodborne DD (also Rodeborne, Rodebourne, Rodbourne, Rudbourne, or Rodburn, died 1442) was an English medieval churchman and university chancellor.

Rodborne was a fellow of The Queen's College, Oxford, where he taught Henry V mathematics. He became a proctor in 1402 and was the warden of Merton College, Oxford, from 1416 to 1417. He was chancellor of the University of Oxford during 1420. He became Archdeacon of Sudbury. From 1433 until his death in 1442, he was Bishop of St David's in Wales.

References

 

Year of birth unknown
1442 deaths
Fellows of The Queen's College, Oxford
Medieval English mathematicians
Wardens of Merton College, Oxford
Chancellors of the University of Oxford
Bishops of St Davids
14th-century English people
15th-century English people
Archdeacons of Sudbury
14th-century English clergy
15th-century English clergy